János Nagy (born 7 August 1992) is a Hungarian striker player who plays for Kazincbarcika.

Club statistics

Updated to games played as of 27 June 2020.

Honours
Újpest
Hungarian Cup (1): 2013–14

External links
 HLSZ 
 HLSZ 
 

Living people
1992 births
People from Szolnok
Hungarian footballers
Hungary under-21 international footballers
Association football midfielders
Újpest FC players
Szigetszentmiklósi TK footballers
BFC Siófok players
Kaposvári Rákóczi FC players
Kazincbarcikai SC footballers
Nemzeti Bajnokság I players
Nemzeti Bajnokság II players
Nemzeti Bajnokság III players
Sportspeople from Jász-Nagykun-Szolnok County
21st-century Hungarian people